Atkaracalar is a town in Çankırı Province in the Central Anatolia region of Turkey. It is the seat of Atkaracalar District. Its population is 2,214 (2021). The town consists of 6 quarters: Gazibey, Mollaosman, Kıran, Ilker, Hoca and Ilıpınar.

Atkaracalar is a typical Central Anatolian town, the inhabitants of Atkaracalar are primarily agricultural with barley, wheat, beans. And animal husbandry is most common in the district.

References

External links
 Municipality's official website 

Populated places in Atkaracalar District
Towns in Turkey